White Oak is an unincorporated community in Raleigh County, West Virginia, United States. White Oak has a post office with ZIP code 25989.

References

Unincorporated communities in Raleigh County, West Virginia
Unincorporated communities in West Virginia